Maria Andreyevna Simonova (born 7 January 1996) is a Russian ice dancer. With partner Dmitri Dragun, she is the 2012 Youth Olympics bronze medalist.

Programs 
(with Dragun)

Competitive highlights 
(with Dragun)

References

External links 
 

Russian female ice dancers
1996 births
Living people
Sportspeople from Tolyatti
Figure skaters at the 2012 Winter Youth Olympics
20th-century Russian women
21st-century Russian women